Vincenzo Amato may refer to:

 Vincenzo Amato (born 1966), Italian actor and sculptor
 Vincenzo Amato (composer) (1629–1670), Italian composer
 Vincenzo Amato (mathematician) (1881–1963), Italian mathematician